Fengyan is a town of Fenggang County, Guizhou, China. , it administers the following communities and villages:
Yipinquan Residential Community
Longjin Residential Community
Xunjian Village
Zhaoping Village
Taoping Village
Xiaohe Village
Zhongshu Village
Zhuchang Village

References

Township-level divisions of Guizhou
Fenggang County